Tamás Rubus (born 13 July 1989 in Békéscsaba) is a Hungarian football player who currently plays for Kisvárda FC.

Club statistics

Updated to games played as of 15 May 2021.

External links

Player profile at HLSZ 

1989 births
Living people
People from Békéscsaba
Hungarian footballers
Association football defenders
Békéscsaba 1912 Előre footballers
Újpest FC players
Vasas SC players
Nyíregyháza Spartacus FC players
Kisvárda FC players
Nemzeti Bajnokság I players
Nemzeti Bajnokság II players
Sportspeople from Békés County